Birkendegård is a manor house and estate located 6 km east of  Kalundborg. The two-storey, Renaissance Revival style main building is from 1954 and was designed by Christian Tybjerg.

History
Birkendegår is first mentioned in 1363 when it was a fief under Roskiulde Bishopric. It was than called Byrchinge and later referred to as Birkingegaard. The current name is most likely a corruption of the original name. At the Reformation in 1536, Birkendegård was confiscated by the crown along with all other property of the Catholic church. Due to its small sixe, it was placed under Kalundborg Castle.

In 1672, Birkendegård was granted to Jørgen Bielke as compensation for his losses during the Second Nordic Wat. Two years later he was granted permission to incorporate the estate as a manor by dissolving all the farms in the surrounding village. This process was however bnot completed until 1700. Jørgen Bielke had been instrumental in protecting Norway against the Swedish army during the war. He was also the owner of nearby Avnsøgård.

In 1886, Birkendegård was acquired by Jørgen Hansen. After his widow's death, it returned to the crown. In 1693, it was ceded to Jørgen Bielke's daughter, Sophie Amalie Bielke, his only surviving child, in return for her giving up all her father's pending demands against the crown.

In 1700, Sophie Amalie Bielke sold Birkendegård to Johan Christopher von Schønbach. He had studied law and served as amtman of Kalundborg, Sæbygård, Drahsholm and Holbæk counties. On his death, his heirs unsuccessfully tried to sell the estate in three different auctions. They ultimately decided to cede the estate to their 23-year-old Johan Christopher von Schønbach. Just two years later, he sold the estate to Terkel Terkelsen.

In 1843, Birkendegård was acquired by Christian Lerche. He became one of the largest landowners in the country. In 1755, was granted permission to turn his holdings into a stamhus with the effect that they could not be divided between heirs, sold or pledged. Christian Lerche died in 1757,When Christian Cornelius Lerche, who had inherited Lerchenborg in 1804, was ennobled with rank of count, on 26 May 1818, Birkendegård was combined with Lerchenborg and a number of other estates to form the Vountship of Lerchenborg  (Grevskabet Lerchenborg). Prior to his death in 1952, Christian Cornelius Lerche had applied for dissolution of the stamhus. All land that was not part of the countship was therefore divided between his four sons. Birkendegård was passed down to his son Vilhelm Cornelius Magnus Lerche. He was succeeded by his own son, Gustav Lerche, who was an estimated farmer.

In 1921, Birkendegård was acquired by two brothers named Jacobsen. Later that same they sold it to Aage Faye. Ge was manager of Nakskov Sugar Factory on Lolland. Birkendegård has remained in the hands of the Faye family since then.

Architecture
The current main building was constructed in 1854 to designs by Christian Yubjerg. It ha stepped gables and dormers.

List of owners
 ( -1536) Roskilde Bispestol
 (1536-1672) Kronen
 (1672- ) Jørgen Bielke
 (1686) Jørgen Hansen
 ( -1693) Kronen
 (1693- ) Sophie Amalie Bielke, gift Hvalsøe
 ( -1700) Hans Hansen Hvalsøe
 (1700-1726) Johan Christopher von Schønbach
 (1726-1732) Anna Elisabeth von Korff, gift von Schønbach
 (1732-1733) Hans Friderich von Schønbach
 (1732-1733) Susanne Lovise von Schønbach
 (1732-1735) Johan Christopher von Schønbach
 (1735-1743) Terkel Terkelsen
 (1743-1757) Christian Lerche
 (1757-1766) Amalie Margrethe Christiane Caroline Leiningen Westerburg, gift Lerche
 (1766-1798) Georg Flemming Lerche
 (1798-1852) Christian Cornelius Lerche
 (1852-1853) Boet efter Christian Cornelius Lerche
 (1853-1895) Vilhelm Cornelius Magnus Lerche
 (1895-1921) Gustav Lerche
 (1921) Jacobsen brothers
 (1921-1949) Aage Faye
 (1949-1999) Gerhard Faye
 (1999- ) Jørgen Faye

References

Manor houses in Kalundborg Municipality